Bx Warrior is the third and final studio album by American New York-based rapper Tim Dog. It was released on May 19, 2006 via Def-Dick/Big City Entertainment, and was produced by Dr. Zygote & Jazz T (from Diversion Tactics), Moe Love (from Ultramagnetic MCs), Ollie Twist, and Tim Dog himself.

Track listing

References

2006 albums
Tim Dog albums